Kuh Sabz (also Romanized as Kūh Sabz, Kooh Sabz, and Kūh-e Sabz) is a village in Ramjerd-e Yek Rural District, in the Central District of Marvdasht County, Fars Province, Iran. At the 2006 census, its population was 2,906, in 652 families.

References 

Populated places in Marvdasht County